Martyn Sekjer (born 1957) is a former English international lawn bowler and an international selector.

Bowls career
Sekjer became a National champion in 1989 when he won the national Championship fours for Kent and Blackheath & Greenwich. Thirteen years later he became the English singles champion when he won the 2002 Championship.

He was selected for England in the fours, at the 1986 Commonwealth Games in Edinburgh, Scotland

Bowls management
He is an EIBA selector for the England indoor international team.

Personal life
He is a company director by trade.

References

1957 births
Living people
English male bowls players
Bowls players at the 1986 Commonwealth Games
Commonwealth Games competitors for England